Kayne Simeon McLaggon (born 21 September 1990) is a Welsh semi-professional footballer who plays as a striker for Barry Town United and the Wales 'C' National Team.

Club career

Southampton
McLaggon was born in Barry, Vale of Glamorgan and went to Barry Comprehensive School from where he joined the Southampton Academy. He came up through the ranks of the Saints youth system, signing professional forms in September 2007 on his 17th birthday.

He was given the number 42 shirt ahead of Southampton's Championship fixture on 26 December 2008 at Home Park against Plymouth Argyle and made his first team debut as a second half substitute, replacing Lee Holmes after 58 minutes. He then starred on his home debut on 28 December, coming off the bench against Reading and setting up Saints' opening goal with a pacy run out of midfield, before supplying David McGoldrick, who finished well past Adam Federici in the Reading goal.

McLaggon scored his first Southampton goal on 27 January 2009, scoring the first of two goals towards Southampton's comeback against Norwich City.

He joined Conference National team Eastbourne Borough on a month's loan on 11 November 2009 after recovering from a long-term injury.

Salisbury City
He was released by Southampton on 15 May 2010 and joined Salisbury City on 4 August. He went on to form a good partnership with Jake Reid.

Bristol Rovers
On 11 July 2011, McLaggon signed a one-year contract with Bristol Rovers.

Weston-super-Mare
On 6 September 2012, McLaggon signed for Weston-super-Mare. He scored his first goal for the club on 6 November 2012 in a 4–3 loss to Frome Town in the Somerset Premier Cup. On 26 March 2013, McLaggon scored his first hattrick for the club in a 3–1 win, away to Sutton United.

Merthyr Town
On 14 October 2013, McLaggon signed for Merthyr Town. He made his debut for Merthyr against Slough Town on 19 October 2013 and scored his first goal from the penalty spot. On 29 April 2014, he scored two goals as Merthyr beat Swindon Supermarine 5–2 to reach the Southern League Division 1 South and West play-off final.

Barry Town United
On 8 June 2017, McLaggon signed for hometown club Barry Town United on a two-year contract.

International career
McLaggon has won nine Welsh under-17 caps (with two goals) and six at under-19 level.

In March 2019, he was called up for the Wales C team and scored on his debut on 20 March in a 2–2 draw with England.

Honours
Individual
Welsh Premier League Team of the Year: 2017–18

References
Infobox club statistics

Specific

External links
Wales international career profile

1990 births
Living people
Sportspeople from Barry, Vale of Glamorgan
Welsh footballers
Association football forwards
Southampton F.C. players
Eastbourne Borough F.C. players
Salisbury City F.C. players
Bristol Rovers F.C. players
Tonbridge Angels F.C. players
Weston-super-Mare A.F.C. players
Merthyr Town F.C. players
Barry Town United F.C. players
English Football League players
National League (English football) players
Cymru Premier players
People educated at Barry Comprehensive School